Trachylepis punctulata, the speckled sand skink or speckled skink, is a species of skink found in southern Africa.

References

Trachylepis
Reptiles described in 1872
Taxa named by José Vicente Barbosa du Bocage